Edoardo Lancini (born 10 April 1994) is an Italian footballer who currently plays for Italian side Palermo as a centre back.

Club career 

Lancini is a youth exponent from Brescia Calcio. He made his debut on 10 May 2014 against Reggina Calcio in a Serie B game. He came in as a 33rd-minute substitute for Valerio Di Cesare in a 0–1 away win.

He joined Palermo in August 2019.

Career statistics

Club

References

External links
 

1994 births
Sportspeople from the Province of Brescia
Living people
Italian footballers
Association football defenders
Brescia Calcio players
Novara F.C. players
Palermo F.C. players
Serie B players
Serie C players
Serie D players
Footballers from Lombardy